des(1-3)IGF-1 is a naturally occurring, endogenous protein, as well as drug, and truncated analogue of insulin-like growth factor 1 (IGF-1). des(1-3)IGF-1 lacks the first three amino acids at the N-terminus of IGF-1 (for a total of 67 amino acids, relative to the 70 of IGF-1). As a result of this difference, it has considerably reduced binding to the insulin-like growth factor-binding proteins (IGFBPs) and enhanced potency (about 10-fold in vivo) relative to IGF-1.

The amino acid sequence of des(1-3)IGF-1 is TLCGAELVDA LQFVCGDRGF YFNKPTGYGS SSRRAPQTGI VDECCFRSCD LRRLEMYCAP LKPAKSA.

See also
 IGF-1 LR3
 Mecasermin
 Mecasermin rinfabate
 Insulin-like growth factor 2

References

Growth hormones
Insulin-like growth factor receptor agonists
Recombinant proteins